Dios may refer to: 

 Dios, Spanish for God
 Dios, a character in the anime/manga series Revolutionary Girl Utena
 Desorption ionization on silicon, an ionization technique in mass spectrometry
 dios (malos), a rock band from Hawthorne, California, formerly known as "dios"
 dios (album), an album release in 2004 by dios (Malos)
 Distal intestinal obstruction syndrome, an obstruction syndrome seen in cystic fibrosis

See also 
 Dio (disambiguation)